Aminata Diouf (born 18 February 1977) is a Senegalese athlete specialising in the sprinting events. She twice competed at the Olympic Games, in 2000 and 2004.

Competition record

Personal bests
Outdoor
100 metres – 11.24 (+1.5 m/s) (La Chaux-de-Fonds 1999) 
200 metres – 22.90 (+0.4 m/s) (Dijon 1998)
400 metres – 55.19 (Celle Ligure 2005)

Indoor
60 metres – 7.42 (Eaubonne 1999)
200 metres – 24.24 (Reims 2004)

References

External links

1977 births
Living people
Senegalese female sprinters
Athletes (track and field) at the 2000 Summer Olympics
Athletes (track and field) at the 2004 Summer Olympics
Olympic athletes of Senegal
African Games bronze medalists for Senegal
African Games medalists in athletics (track and field)
Athletes (track and field) at the 1999 All-Africa Games
Athletes (track and field) at the 2003 All-Africa Games
Athletes (track and field) at the 2007 All-Africa Games
Competitors at the 1999 Summer Universiade
Competitors at the 2001 Summer Universiade
Olympic female sprinters